Luis García Plaza (born 1 December 1972) is a Spanish retired professional footballer who played as a central defender, currently manager of Deportivo Alavés.

Playing career
In his career, García never played in higher than Segunda División B. Born in Madrid, he finished his development at Atlético Madrid and, after three seasons with its reserves, moved to Yeclano CF, where he coincided with José Luis Oltra and Paulino.

Still in the Madrid community, García then represented Rayo Vallecano B, completing his sole season with the club on loan at Talavera CF. In 1996, he signed with Benidorm CF, playing with the Alicante side four years.

García was forced to retire due to injury in 2000, at only 27.

Coaching career
García took up coaching in 2001, starting with amateurs UD Altea and moving after two years to another club in the Valencian Community, Villajoyosa CF of the third tier, remaining the same amount of time there.

In 2005–06, after a very brief spell at Altea, García led Villarreal CF's reserves to the Tercera División championship, but the team failed to gain promotion in the subsequent playoffs. Afterwards, he signed with Elche CF in Segunda División – and also in the Valencia region – being sacked on 7 January 2007 following a 1–1 home draw against Cádiz CF (the team eventually retained their league status).

After one year with former club Benidorm, García was appointed at Levante UD, helping to a return to La Liga after a three-year absence in his second season. In the following campaign he led the side to the 14th place, the home highlights being a 2–0 win over Atlético Madrid and home draws with Real Madrid (0–0) and FC Barcelona (1–1).

On 8 June 2011, García signed for Getafe for three years. He coached the capital outskirts team to the 11th position in his debut season, finishing one better the following year.

García was dismissed on 10 March 2014, after Getafe only collected four draws in 12 games. In the following two seasons, he worked in the UAE First Division League with Baniyas Club.

In June 2017, García was appointed as manager of China League One club Beijing Renhe F.C. on a five-month agreement. He coached the team to promotion back to the Super League in his first season, collecting 13 wins, two draws and three losses; on 9 November, he extended his contract.

García returned to Villarreal on 10 December 2018, replacing the fired Javier Calleja at the helm of the first team. After only one month in charge, and no league wins, he too was relieved of his duties.

On 9 July 2019, García headed back to Beijing Renhe following the resignation of Aleksandar Stanojević. He left on 18 November following their relegation, having won none and drawn two of 11 games. Before the end of the year, he found a new job at Al-Shabab FC (Riyadh), ninth in the Saudi Professional League.

On 6 August 2020, García replaced RCD Espanyol-bound Vicente Moreno at RCD Mallorca in the second division, winning promotion as runners-up in his debut campaign. On 22 March 2022, with the club inside the relegation zone, he was dismissed.

Managerial statistics

Notes

References

External links

1972 births
Living people
Spanish footballers
Footballers from Madrid
Association football defenders
Segunda División B players
Tercera División players
Atlético Madrid B players
Yeclano CF players
Rayo Vallecano B players
Talavera CF players
Benidorm CF footballers
Spanish football managers
La Liga managers
Segunda División managers
Segunda División B managers
Tercera División managers
Villarreal CF B managers
Elche CF managers
Levante UD managers
Getafe CF managers
Villarreal CF managers
RCD Mallorca managers
Deportivo Alavés managers
UAE Pro League managers
Baniyas SC managers
Chinese Super League managers
Beijing Renhe F.C. managers
Saudi Professional League managers
Al Shabab FC (Riyadh) managers
Spanish expatriate football managers
Expatriate football managers in the United Arab Emirates
Expatriate football managers in China
Expatriate football managers in Saudi Arabia
Spanish expatriate sportspeople in the United Arab Emirates
Spanish expatriate sportspeople in China
Spanish expatriate sportspeople in Saudi Arabia